Collaert, Colaert or Collaart may refer to :
 Hans Collaert a.k.a. Jan Collaert I (c. 1530–1580), a Flemish engraver
His sons:
 Adriaen Collaert (c.1560–1618), Flemish designer and engraver
 Jan Collaert II (c. 1561–1620s), Flemish engraver and printmaker
 Jacques Colaert (?–1600), a Flemish privateer
 Jacob Collaert (floruit circa 1625–1635), a Flemish admiral who served as privateer and Dunkirker
 Jean Antoine de Collaert (1761–1816) led French cavalry for Napoleon and later Dutch-Belgian cavalry against Napoleon